The 2019 Summit League men's soccer season will be the 14th season of men's varsity soccer in the conference. The season will begin in late August 2019 and conclude in mid-November 2019.

Denver enter the season as the defending regular season and tournament champions.

This is the final season for Purdue Fort Wayne as a Summit member. The Mastodons will leave for the Horizon League on July 1, 2020. The Summit will maintain its men's soccer membership at six with the return of the Kansas City Roos (formerly known as the UMKC Kangaroos), which will rejoin at the same date after seven seasons in the Western Athletic Conference.

Background

Head coaches

Preseason

Preseason poll 
The preseason poll was released on August 19, 2019.

Preseason national polls 
The preseason national polls were released in July and August 2019. Denver was the only Summit League program ranked in preseason polls across all major polls.

Preseason Players to Watch

Regular season

Early season tournaments 

Early season tournaments will be announced in late Spring and Summer 2019.

Conference results

Positions by round

Postseason

Summit League tournament

NCAA tournament

Rankings

National rankings

Regional rankings - USC West Region

Awards and honors

Player of the Week

Postseason honors

2020 MLS Draft

The 2020 MLS SuperDraft will be held in January 2020.

Homegrown players 

The Homegrown Player Rule is a Major League Soccer program that allows MLS teams to sign local players from their own development academies directly to MLS first team rosters. Before the creation of the rule in 2008, every player entering Major League Soccer had to be assigned through one of the existing MLS player allocation processes, such as the MLS SuperDraft.

To place a player on its homegrown player list, making him eligible to sign as a homegrown player, players must have resided in that club's home territory and participated in the club's youth development system for at least one year. Players can play college soccer and still be eligible to sign a homegrown contract.

References

External links 
 Summit League Men's Soccer

 
2019 NCAA Division I men's soccer season